Abduweli Ayup (born April 1973) is a Western educated linguist and poet who operated Uyghur language schools in Kashgar, Xinjiang, in the northwest part of China. The Uyghur Human Rights Project published his biography in Resisting Chinese Linguistic Imperialism: Abduweli Ayup and the Movement for Uyghur Mother Tongue-Based Education.

Background
Abduweli Ayup is a linguist specializing in Uyghur language education. He is a strong proponent of linguistic human rights, specifically, the right for the intergenerational transmission of language and culture. From December 2005 to June 2006, Abduweli was a visiting scholar at Ankara University, Turkey. He later received a Ford Foundation fellowship to study at the University of Kansas in the United States, and completed his master's degree in Linguistics in 2011. Upon graduation, Abduweli returned to Xinjiang and opened schools to teach the Uyghur language, his mother tongue.

Abduweli was arrested in Kashgar on August 20, 2013 by economic investigation team of Tianshan District, Ürümqi City  and accused of false funding and illegally raising funds for his proposed schools. Along with him, Dilyar Obul and Muhemmet Sidik Abdurshit, two of his partners involved with the school, were also detained. Abduweli suffered through illness while in prison, where he was held incommunicado for nearly nine months. He was not formally charged until May 17, 2014, when he and his partners were accused of having collected "illegal donations" to support their school. After a one-day trial on July 11, on August 21 the court convicted Abduweli and his associates of having "committed a crime of abusing public money." According  sentence in writing, aimed at opening mother language school, Abduweli and two of his partners had illegally accepted 590,000 CNY (about $95,000)in deposits from 17 people. During case processing time no one among the 17 have asked for their money back. Despite all of that Abduweli was sentenced to 18 months in prison and fined $13,000. Colleagues and human rights organizations contend that Abduweli's punishment is part of a government plan to marginalize and displace the Uyghur language.

Abduwali was released on November 20, 2014, after his partners, Dilyar Obul and Muhemmet Sidik, appealed their verdict. Abduweli has returned to Kashgar, and continues to teach at his friends' language training school, which his wife, Miraghul, worked in his absence.

In 2017, Erkin Ayup, brother of Abduweli Ayup, who had recently been promoted as head of oversight for the Organization Department of the Committee of the Communist Party of China in his hometown of Tokkuzak (Tuokezhake), Kona Sheher County (Shufu), Kashgar Prefecture, Xinjiang, went missing. In an interview conducted by Radio Free Asia, a staffer at his former office said he had been sent to a re-education camp near Kashgar Airport.

Response
The Linguistic Society of America and the Committee of Concerned Scientists appealed the President of China to investigate the circumstances under which Abduweli Ayup was detained, and petitioned for fair treatment as per China's obligations under International Law.

Supporters created a Facebook page advocating justice for Abduweli.

References

Living people
Linguists from China
Uyghur activists
1973 births